Ireland was represented by Red Hurley, with the song "When", at the 1976 Eurovision Song Contest, which took place on 3 April in The Hague. "When" was chosen as the Irish entry at the national final on 8 February.

Before Eurovision

National final 
The final was held at the studios of broadcaster RTÉ in Dublin, hosted by Mike Murphy. Eight songs took part, with the winner chosen by voting from eight regional juries.

Other participants included past and future Irish representatives The Swarbriggs (1975 & 1977), Cathal Dunne (1979) and 1992 Eurovision winner Linda Martin, who performed as a member of the group Chips.

At Eurovision 
On the night of the final Hurley performed 7th in the running order, following Belgium and preceding the Netherlands. At the close of voting, "When" had picked up 54 points, placing Ireland 10th of the 18 entries. Ireland received one maximum 12 from Italy, which the Irish jury reciprocated by awarding their 12 to the Italian song – oddly, neither country received a maximum vote from any other national jury.

Voting

References 

1976
Countries in the Eurovision Song Contest 1976
Eurovision
Eurovision